Truman Talley Books was an imprint at:
Times Books (1980-1983)
E. P. Dutton (1983-2008)